The Whore's Trophy is Symphony in Peril's second and final full-length album, and was released on February 15, 2005. The basis of the album is the Bible's Book of Revelation, specifically chapter 17.

Track listing 

"Perelandra" - 0:35
"For Now We See in a Mirror, Dimly, But Then Face to Face" - 4:13
"Stiletto" - 2:13
"Seduction by Design" - 3:08
"...And She Was Drunk With the Blood of the Saints" - 4:25
"Revolving Door Romance" - 3:35
"The Whore's Trophy I" - 3:14
"The Whore's Trophy II" - 3:58
"Waiting to Breathe" - 4:12
"This Flame Breeds Disbelief" - 1:26
"Inherent Scars" - 4:05
"Aborting the Fabricated" - 2:56

References

2005 albums
Symphony in Peril albums